Mohammad Sayedul Haque (4 March 1942 – 16 December 2017) was a Bangladesh Awami League politician and served as the  Minister of Fisheries and Livestock of the Government of Bangladesh.

Early life and career
Haque was born in  Nasirnagar under Brahmanbaria District. He completed MA (economics) and LLB from the University of Dhaka in 1969.

Haque was elected a member of parliament from Brahmanbaria-1 (Nasirnagar) constituency five times, in 1973, 1996, 2001, 2008 and 2014. He was appointed the fisheries and livestock minister after the Bangladesh Awami League formed its government in 2014.

References

1942 births
2017 deaths
People from Brahmanbaria district
University of Dhaka alumni
Awami League politicians
Fisheries and Livestock ministers of Bangladesh
1st Jatiya Sangsad members
7th Jatiya Sangsad members
8th Jatiya Sangsad members
9th Jatiya Sangsad members
10th Jatiya Sangsad members